Megson is a surname. Notable people with the surname include:
Don Megson (born 1936), English former footballer and manager
Gary Megson (born 1959), English former footballer and manager, son of Don Megson 
Neil Megson (soccer) (born 1962), British/American soccer player, also a son of Don Megson
Genesis P-Orridge, real name Neil Andrew Megson, English singer-songwriter and musician

See also
Megson (disambiguation)